Charles Dean Kimball (September 13, 1859 – December 8, 1930) was an American politician and the 47th Governor of Rhode Island.

Early life
Kimball was born in Providence, Rhode Island on September 13, 1859 as the son of Emery S. Kimball and Mary C. (Briggs) Kimball. He married Gertrude C. Greenalgh November 24, 1885. After school education, he made his career in business.

Political career
Kimball was a member of Rhode Island House of Representatives 1894-99 and Lieutenant Governor of Rhode Island 1900-01. He became governor of Rhode Island after the death of incumbent governor William Gregory. He held the governor's office from December 16, 1901 to January 3, 1903. Kimball worked for changes in the State constitution to give the governor veto powers and change state elections from an annual to a biennial basis, both of which were eventually achieved.

During Kimball's term, the beginning of the term of office for the state's general officers was changed from the last Tuesday in May to the first Tuesday in January.

Kimball was an active member of the Freemasons.

In 1904 he joined the Rhode Island Society of the Sons of the American Revolution and served as the Society's president from 1911 to 1912.  He was also a member of the Rhode Island Society of Colonial Wars.  In 1925 he was admitted as an honorary member of the Rhode Island Society of the Cincinnati.

During World War I he served as Chairman of the Draft Board for Division 1 in Rhode Island.

Governor Kimball died on December 8, 1930. Interment at Swan Point Cemetery, Providence, Rhode Island.

Notes

Sources
 Sobel, Robert and John Raimo. Biographical Directory of the Governors of the United States, 1789-1978. Greenwood Press, 1988.

External links
 

1859 births
1930 deaths
Republican Party governors of Rhode Island
Politicians from Providence, Rhode Island
Burials at Swan Point Cemetery